Vicos or Paccharuri (possibly from Ancash Quechua paqtsa waterfall, ruri inside; valley or little river) is a  high mountain in the Cordillera Blanca in the Andes of Peru. It is situated in the Ancash Region, Carhuaz Province, Marcara District. Paccharuri lies in the Huascarán National Park, southwest of Copa and southeast of Lake Lejiacocha.

References

  

Mountains of Peru
Mountains of Ancash Region
Huascarán National Park